Azúa is a Basque surname. Notable people with this surname include the following:

Carlos Real de Azúa (1916–1977), Uruguayan lawyer and historian
Félix de Azúa (Félix de Azúa Comella) (born 1944), Spanish writer
Goizeder Azúa (Goizeder Victoria Azúa Barríos) (born 1984), Venezuelan TV host and model
Pedro de Vivar (Pedro de Vivar y Ruiz de Azúa) (1742–1820), Chilean priest and political figure

Basque-language surnames